Bathyxylophila peroniana is a species of sea snail, a marine gastropod mollusk or micromollusk in the family Larocheidae.

Description
The height of the shell reaches 1.1 mm.

Distribution
This species occurs in the bathyal zone off New South Wales, Australia.

References

 Marshall B.A. 1988. Skeneidae, Vitrinellidae and Orbitestellidae (Mollusca: Gastropoda) associated with biogenic substrata from bathyal depths off New Zealand and New South Wales. Journal of Natural History, 22(4): 949-1004

External links
 To World Register of Marine Species

Larocheidae
Gastropods described in 1988